Miss USA 1994 was the 43rd Miss USA pageant, televised live from the South Padre Island Convention Centre on South Padre Island, Texas on February 11, 1994.  At the conclusion of the final competition, Lu Parker of South Carolina was crowned by outgoing titleholder Kenya Moore of Michigan.

The pageant was hosted by Bob Goen for the first of three years replacing Dick Clark, with color commentary by Arthel Neville and a special guest appearance by Laura Harring, Miss USA 1985.  Entertainment was provided by Doug Stone.  During the live broadcast, the organizers of that year's Miss Universe pageant held in Manila, Philippines were introduced during the show along with that country's representative to said international competition, Charlene Bonin Gonzales, Miss Philippines 1994.

Host city
This was the first of three consecutive years that the pageant was held on South Padre Island.  The announcement that the pageant would be held there was made on August 11, 1993.

Contestants arrived on January 27 for two weeks of events and preliminary competitions before the final telecast.  This included a dinner event in Matamoros, Tamaulipas, Mexico, put on by the mayor and city officials, which became an issue when rebel activity on the United States-Mexican border led to fears for the contestants' safety.  The city had contributed more than $100,000 to South Padre's bid to host the pageant, fundraising that was mirrored by other cities in the Rio Grande Valley.

Results

Placements

Special awards
Miss Congeniality: Denise White (Oregon)
Miss Photogenic: Patricia Southall (Virginia)

Historical significance 
 South Carolina wins competition for the third time.
 Virginia earns the 1st runner-up position for the second time. The last time it placed this was in 1954.
 North Carolina earns the 2nd runner-up position for the second time. The last time it placed this was in 1975.
 Louisiana finishes as Top 6 for the first time and reaches its highest placement since 1989.
 Texas finishes as Top 6 for the first time and reaches its highest placement since Gretchen Polhemus won in 1989.
 New York finishes as Top 6 for the first time and reaches its highest placement since Mary Therese Friel won in 1979.
 States that placed in semifinals the previous year were Hawaii, Kansas, New York, South Carolina, Tennessee and Texas.
 Kansas placed for the fourth consecutive year. 
 South Carolina and Texas placed for the third consecutive year.
 Hawaii, New York and Tennessee made their second consecutive placement. 
 Louisiana, North Carolina and Virginia last placed in 1992.
 Illinois last placed in 1991.
 Missouri last placed in 1987.
 Minnesota last placed in 1985.
 Georgia breaks an ongoing streak of placements since 1992.
 California breaks an ongoing streak of placements since 1991.

Scores

Preliminary competition
The following are the contestants' scores in the preliminary competition.

 Winner
 First runner-up
 Second runner-up 
 Finalist 
 Semi-finalist

Final competition

 Winner
 First runner-up
 Second runner-up 
 Finalists

Delegates
The Miss USA 1994 delegates were:

 Alabama - Melaea Nelms
 Alaska - Dawn Stuvek
 Arizona - Jennifer Tisdale
 Arkansas - Hannah Hilliard
 California - Toay Foster
 Colorado - Kimberly Veldhuizen
 Connecticut - Mistrella Egan
 Delaware - Teresa Kline
 District of Columbia - Angela McGlowan
 Florida - Cynthia Redding
 Georgia - Andrea Moore
 Hawaii - Nadine Tanega
 Idaho - Trenna Wheeler
 Illinois - Kathleen Farrell
 Indiana - Kim Scull
 Iowa - Callie Pandit
 Kansas - Carol Hovenkamp
 Kentucky - Kim Buford
 Louisiana - Shirelle Hebert
 Maine - Colleen Brink
 Maryland - Wendy Davis
 Massachusetts - Michelle Atamian
 Michigan - Kelly Richelle Pawlowski
 Minnesota - Jolene Stavrakis
 Mississippi - Leslie Lynn Jetton
 Missouri - Shelly Lehman
 Montana - Kelly Brown
 Nebraska - Shawn Wolff
 Nevada - Angela Lambert
 New Hampshire - Kelly Zarse
 New Jersey - Rosa Velez
 New Mexico - Jill Vasquez
 New York - Jennifer Gareis
 North Carolina - Lynn Jenkins
 North Dakota - Amy Jane Lantz
 Ohio - Lisa Michelle Allison
 Oklahoma - Angela Parrick
 Oregon - Denise White
 Pennsylvania - Linda Chiaraluna
 Rhode Island - Raye Anne Johnson
 South Carolina - Lu Parker
 South Dakota - Tabitha Moude
 Tennessee - Leah Hulan
 Texas - Christine Friedel
 Utah - Vanessa Munns
 Vermont - Christy Beltrami
 Virginia - Patricia Southall
 Washington - Angel Ward
 West Virginia - Linda Bailey
 Wisconsin - Gina Desmond
 Wyoming - Tolan Clark

Contestant notes
Kathleen Farrell (Illinois) had previously held the Miss Illinois 1992 title and won a non-finalist talent award in the Miss America 1993 pageant. One of her sisters Monica Farrell also competed in both pageants, holding the Miss Florida 1985 and Miss Florida USA 1988 titles, and she placed third runner-up at Miss USA 1988. Their other sister Mary-Ann Farrell was Miss New York 1984 and was a semi-finalist at Miss America 1985.
Leah Hulan (Tennessee) also competed at Miss America 1993, as she was previously Miss Tennessee 1992.
Delegates who had previously competed in the Miss Teen USA pageant were:
Christy Beltrami (Vermont) - Miss Vermont Teen USA 1987
RayeAnne Johnson (Rhode Island) - Miss Rhode Island Teen USA 1987
Jill Vasquez (New Mexico) - Miss New Mexico Teen USA 1988
Tabitha Moude (South Dakota) - Miss South Dakota Teen USA 1991
Jill Vasquez (New Mexico) became one of the directors of the Miss California USA pageant in 2007.
Jolene Stravrakis (Minnesota) placed first runner-up the Miss Minnesota USA 1988, and briefly held the title after the winner was arrested for shoplifting.  She resigned days later when it was revealed she too had been arrested for shoplifting in 1986. In 1994 she won the title in her own right in her last year of eligibility after her criminal record was expunged. Stravrakis also was Miss Minnesota World 1992 and competed in Miss World America 1992 but did not place.
Amy Jane Lantz (North Dakota) appeared as a contestant on Wheel of Fortune, which originally aired March 10, 1995.
This was the last year until 2009 that no former Miss Teen USA state titleholder managed to place.
 Jennifer Gareis (New York) went on to play Donna Logan in The Bold and the Beautiful. She also made a brief cameo in Miss Congeniality as the lover of a Miss United States contestant who shouts from the audience.
Pat Southall (Virginia) went on to marry Bad Boys actor Martin Lawrence. That marriage lasted 1-year and ended in 1996. In 2000, Pat married football great, Emmitt Smith and the couple have been together ever since.
Nadine Tanega (Hawaii), who placed in the Top 12, was Miss International Hawaii 1990 and was 2nd Runner-Up at Miss International 1990. She was also Miss Hawaii World 1992 and was 3rd Runner-Up at Miss World America 1992.

Judges
Erika Andersch
Carol Connors
John Paul DeJoria
Pedro Luis Garcia
Mai Shanley
Al Joyner
Aaron Kaplan
Derrick Lassic
Meg Liberman
Sheryl Lee Ralph

References

External links
Official website
Miss USA 1994
Lu Parker Official website
Lu Parker's Miss USA page
South Carolina High School Teacher Wins Miss USA Contest
Miss South Carolina Crowned Miss Usa On Padre Island
Miss USA 1994 in Hollywood.com

1994
1994 beauty pageants
February 1994 events in the United States
1994 in Texas